Paphinia lindeniana is a species of orchid native to Colombia, Venezuela, Brazil, Peru and possibly Guyana.

Taxonomy 
The classification of this orchid species was published by Heinrich Gustav Reichenbach (1824–1889) in Lindenia; Iconographie des Orchidees. 3: 23, pl. 106. 1887 Flora, 70: 497. 1887 - Ghent & Brussels. Distribution: Venezuela (Northern South America, Southern America).

Plant morphology 
Original entry in Lindenia 3: t. 106 - 1887
Paphinia lindeniana Affinis Paphinia cristata (Lindl.), labello diversissimo, angulis hypochilii angusti antrorsis basi epichilii paulisper latiorbus, epichilio sessili utrinque semihastato triangulo retuso, callo parvo sub apice, callis filiformibus utrinque in margine densis, usque ante basin, disco callis papulosis crebis seubpedimenmedianae, ibi ampliata tabulari emarginata ob sinum medianum, superne ciliolata, columnae alis rotundatis. America aequatorialis.

Paphinia lindeniana is related to Paphinia cristata, very diverse labellum, angular hypochile, narrow

Flower morphology 
The flower has similar star-shaped red sepals and petals, a pale yellow curved column, and a white fringed labellum. The sepals often have red streaks and spots on a white background.

References

External links 

lindeniana
Orchids of South America
Plants described in 1887